Wen-Hsiung Li (born 1942) is a Taiwanese-American scientist working in the fields of molecular evolution, population genetics, and genomics.  He is currently the James Watson Professor of Ecology and Evolution at the University of Chicago and a Principal Investigator at the Institute of Information Science and Genomics Research Center, Academia Sinica, Taiwan.

Biography
Li was born in 1942 in Taiwan. In 1968 he received a M.S. in geophysics from National Central University. In 1972 he received his Ph.D in applied mathematics at Brown University in Providence, Rhode Island. From 1972 to 1973 he was a post-doctoral researcher at the University of Wisconsin Madison (genetics), working with James F. Crow. In 1973 he moved to the University of Texas, where he was appointed as a professor in 1984. Since 1998 he has been a professor at The University of Chicago.

Scientific contributions
Professor Li is best known for his studies on the molecular clock (i.e. rates and patterns of DNA sequence evolution) and on the patterns and consequences of gene duplication.

In 2003, he received the international Balzan Prize for his contribution to genetics and evolutionary biology, and was elected to the National Academy of Sciences, who cited his role in "establishing theoretical foundations for molecular phylogenetics and evolutionary genomics".  He is the author of the first texts in the field of molecular evolution, Molecular Evolution and Fundamentals of Molecular Evolution (co-authored with Dan Graur), and an author on more than 200 peer-reviewed publications.

Honors
 Academician, Academia Sinica Taiwan, 1998
 Member, American Academy of Arts and Sciences, 1999
 President of the “Society for Molecular Biology and Evolution”, 2000
 Member, National Academy of Sciences, 2003
 Balzan prize 2003 for genetics and evolution (The third recipient, following Sewall Wright (1984) and John Maynard Smith (1991)).
 Inaugural Chen Award for Achievement in Human Genetic and Genomic Research, Human Genome Organisation, 2008
 2019 SMBE Motoo Kimura Lifetime Contribution Award

Selected publications

Selected books

References

External links
Official research profile
Lab web site
 National Academy of Sciences citation
Balzan Foundation profile
Academia Sinica website reference for the HUGO/ "Chen Award" 2008

1942 births
American people of Taiwanese descent
Evolutionary biologists
Living people
Theoretical biologists
Population geneticists
Members of Academia Sinica
Members of the United States National Academy of Sciences
21st-century biologists
American geneticists
Taiwanese biologists
People from Pingtung County
Brown University alumni
National Central University alumni
University of Chicago faculty